Jocelyn Samantha Read is a Canadian physicist and associate professor of physics at California State University, Fullerton, known for her research on gravitational waves and neutron stars. She is a member of the LIGO Scientific Collaboration, and is an author of research characterizing the gravitational waves caused by neutron star and black hole collisions, and using the measurements of those waves to provide observational verification of the equations of state of neutron stars.

Education and career
Read grew up in Calgary, Alberta, and was motivated to study science out of a childhood love of science fiction. She did her undergraduate studies at the University of British Columbia, with honours in a double major in mathematics and physics; she writes that she chose this combination of topics both for its difficulty and its flexibility in future directions. She then went to the Center for Gravitation and Cosmology at the University of Wisconsin–Milwaukee, where her 2008 doctoral dissertation, Neutron stars in compact binary systems: from the equation of state to gravitational radiation, was jointly supervised by John L. Friedman and Jolien Creighton.

Before joining the California State University, Fullerton faculty in 2012, she was a postdoctoral researcher at the Max Planck Institute for Gravitational Physics (Albert Einstein Institute) and at the University of Mississippi.

Recognition
In 2019, Read was named a Fellow of the American Physical Society (APS), after a nomination from the APS Division of Gravitational Physics, "for contributions to the understanding of extreme matter within neutron stars, including its effects on gravitational-wave observations, and for the inclusive recruiting and mentoring of next generation gravitational-wave scientists".

References

External links
 Home page
 

Year of birth missing (living people)
Living people
People from Calgary
American women physicists
Canadian women physicists
University of British Columbia Faculty of Science alumni
University of Wisconsin–Milwaukee alumni
California State University, Fullerton faculty
Fellows of the American Physical Society
21st-century American women